Jiří Adamec (born 21 March 1982) is a Czech footballer who played as a forward. He made over 90 appearances in the Czech First League between 2000 and 2008.

References

External links
 
 
 

1982 births
Living people
Czech footballers
Czech Republic under-21 international footballers
Czech First League players
FK Drnovice players
1. FK Příbram players
FK Baník Most players
SK Dynamo České Budějovice players
Association football forwards
Czech expatriate footballers
Expatriate footballers in Austria